Abyss is a 1980 role-playing game adventure for Tunnels & Trolls published by Flying Buffalo.

Plot summary
Abyss is a solitaire adventure for a Tunnels & Trolls player character who has died, and the character's journey through the underworld for rebirth.

Reception
Jerry Epperson reviewed Abyss in The Space Gamer No. 33. Epperson commented that "Abyss, for all its deadliness, belongs in every T&T player's library."

Reviews
Pegasus #2 (1981)

References

Role-playing game supplements introduced in 1980
Tunnels & Trolls adventures